
Gmina Siemiątkowo is a rural gmina (administrative district) in Żuromin County, Masovian Voivodeship, in east-central Poland.

Villages
Gmina Siemiątkowo contains the villages and settlements of Antoniewo, Budy Koziebrodzkie, Chomęc, Chrapoń, Cyndaty, Dzban, Dzieczewo, Goszczk, Gradzanowo Kościelne, Gutkowo, Julianowo, Karolinowo, Kolonia Siemiątkowska, Krzeczanowo, Łaszewo, Łaszewo-Wietrznik, Nowa Wieś, Nowe Budy Osieckie, Nowopole, Osowa Drobińska, Osowa Krzeczanowska, Osowa Łaszewska, Pijawnia, Rostowa, Siciarz, Siemiątkowo, Siemiątkowo-Kosmy, Siemiątkowo-Rechty, Siemiątkowo-Rogale, Siemiątkowo-Siódmaczka, Sokołowy Kąt, Stare Budy Osieckie, Suwaki, Wojciechowo, Wola Łaszewska, Wolany, Zaborze Krzeczanowskie, Ziemiany and Złe Borki.

Neighbouring gminas
Gmina Siemiątkowo is bordered by the gminas of Bieżuń, Raciąż, Radzanów and Zawidz.

References
Polish official population figures 2006

Siemiatkowo
Żuromin County